The social safety net (SSN) consists of non-contributory assistance existing to improve lives of vulnerable families and individuals experiencing poverty and destitution. Examples of SSNs are previously-contributory social pensions, in-kind and food transfers, conditional and unconditional cash transfers, fee waivers, public works, and school feeding programs.

The core idea of SSN can be understood as an analogy to a circus artist walking on a tightrope with a net hanging under it, ready to catch the artist if she falls. It is not helping her to get up on the line again, but prevents her from falling to the ground, avoiding potentially life-threatening damages. In the same way, the economic social safety net provides a certain minimum amount of welfare or safety that the society has agreed that no one should fall below.

Definitions 
There is no exact and unified definition of the concept of SSN. The World Bank has one of the widest definitions, but multiple definitions are used by different scholars, institutions, and organizations such as the International Labor Organization (ILO) and ESCAP. This lead some scholars to go so far as to hold that there is no point in using the term SSN as it is rarely used consistently and are instead advocating that the different components of SSN are used for analysis rather than the term itself.

Economic rationale 
Initially, social safety nets were intended for three purposes: Institutional reform, make the adjustment programs feasible politically, and most importantly poverty reduction.

The social safety net is a club good, which follows from it being excludable but non-rival. Following the already mentioned analogy, the circus artist may be excluded from using the safety net if someone decides that she will not be allowed to have one, but her falling into the safety net does not impede other circus artists from falling into it as well, thus it is non-rival.

Critics argue that SSN decreases the incentives to work, gives no graduation encouragement, tears down communal ties, and places a financial burden potentially too heavy to carry in the longer run. Furthermore, it has shown very difficult to decrease the SSN once it has been extended. Casper Hunnerup Dahl, a Danish economist, finds that there is a strong negative correlation between the generosity of OECD welfare states and the work ethic. the Swedish economist Martin Ljunge finds that an increasingly generous sick leave system leads younger Swedes to stay more at home than their older peers.

However, proponents argue that the case is quite the opposite, that even tiny transfers are used productively and often invested, be it in education, assets, social networks, or other income-generating activities.

History 
In the early 1990s the term "social safety net" surged in popularity, particularly among the Bretton Woods Institutions which used the term frequently in relation to their structural adjustment programs. These programs were intended to restructure the economies of developing countries, and these countries introduced social safety nets to reduce the impact of the programs on the poorest groups.

The increased importance of SSN over the last decades is also shown in UN's Sustainable Development Goals (SDG). One of the 17 goals is to eradicate poverty and among the sub-goals are implementing social protection systems and floors for everyone, and substantially reducing the potential impacts of environmental, economic and social shocks and disasters on the poor.

Types of systems 
The volume of spending varies vastly between countries. While wealthy countries in the OECD on average spend 2.7% of GDP on social safety nets, developing countries spend an average of 1.5%. There are also regional differences. European and Central Asian countries spend the highest share of their GDP followed in a diminishing spending manner by Sub-Saharan Africa, Latin America and Caribbean, East Asia and Pacific, Middle East and North Africa, and lastly South Asia. In addition, regions tend to favor different types of safety nets. Non-contributory pensions are widespread in East Asia, while Latin Americans often favor conditional cash transfers and South Asians public works.

André Sapir creates four groups of European social models. These are the Mediterranean countries (Spain, Portugal, Italy, Greece), Continental countries (Luxembourg, Germany, France, Belgium, Austria), Anglo-Saxon countries (United Kingdom and Ireland), and Nordic countries (Sweden, Finland, Denmark + Netherlands). Building on this, Boeri assesses the abilities of the different social models to reduce poverty and income inequality. His findings show that the reduction in inequality through redistribution is lowest in the Mediterranean countries with 35%, while the Nordic countries have the highest redistribution with a 42% reduction. In the middle one can find the two other models with 39%. Considering the numbers after taxes and transfers, the order of the countries alters a bit. When looking at how big a portion of the population has an income under the national poverty threshold the Nordic and Continental countries come out on top with only 12% living in poverty, while the Mediterranean and Anglo-Saxon countries come out last with 20%. 

In South Africa there are grants for people unable to support themselves. Many of the grants are focused on children. Social services administer these grants.

Effects 
The World Bank has estimated that SSNs have helped around 36% of the poorest in the world escape extreme poverty, the number being 8% for relative poverty. The contribution to narrowing the inequality gap has been even bigger. Here the SSN has helped reducing the absolute poverty gap with 45% whereas the relative poverty gap is reduced by 16%. Despite these numbers, the World Bank claim that the real numbers are probably even higher.

Still, the biggest challenge prevails in the poorest countries. Only 20% of the poorest inhabitants in low-income countries are included in SSNs. Consequently, the smallest decreases in poverty and inequality are found in these countries. There are a couple of probable reasons for this. First, a lot of surveys from low-income countries do not include specific SSN programs nor all the different programs that they have. Second, there is a lack of recent data regarding these issues compared to other country groups.

See also
Basic income guarantee
Social insurance
Social network
Social security
Social welfare provision
Solidarity economy
Welfare (financial aid)
Welfare state

References

External links
North American city crime rates

Social programs